The New York State Engineer and Surveyor was a state cabinet officer in the State of New York between 1848 and 1926. During the re-organization of the state government under Governor Al Smith, the office was abolished and its responsibilities transferred to the New York State Department of Public Works, which in turn was absorbed by the New York State Department of Transportation in 1967.

History
The office was established as Surveyor General in 1781.

Until 1822, the Surveyor General was appointed by the Council of Appointment for an indefinite term. The second holder of the office, Simeon De Witt, was considered the most qualified person for the office, and was re-appointed without regard to party politics. Even the Bucktails did not oust him when they were struggling with his first cousin DeWitt Clinton. The office was at first mostly occupied with surveying the uncharted area of the State and issuing official maps. In 1817, the Surveyor General became a member of the Erie Canal Commission.

From 1823 to 1845, the Surveyor General was elected by joint ballot of the New York State Legislature for a term of three years. Simeon De Witt was re-elected in 1823, 1826, 1829 and 1832, and died in office in 1834.

The Constitution of 1846 renamed the office as State Engineer and Surveyor, and the office's major concern was to be the supervision of the maintenance and enlargement of the Canal network. The candidates were required to be practical engineers.

From 1847 on, the State Engineer and the other state cabinet officers were elected by the voters at the state elections in November in odd years to a two-year term, so that, until 1877, they served in the second half of the term of the governor in office and the first half of the term of the succeeding governor, since the governors at the time were elected to a two-year term in even years. From 1877 on, the Governor served a three-year term, while the State Engineer continued to be elected for two years. The State Engineer elected in 1895 received an additional year and served a three-year term, and from 1898 on, the State Engineer and other state officers were elected in even years to a two-year term at the same time as the Governor, and they served concurrently.

Surveyors General

Engineers and Surveyors

Notes

 
State constitutional officers of New York (state)